is the Japanese word for "Star", and the Japanese word for a Buddhist "Priest" &/or "Monk" (僧, 法師 and 比丘).  

Hoshi may also refer to:

People with the surname
 , Japanese badminton athlete
 , Japanese professional wrestler
 , Japanese alpine skier
  or Hokutoumi Nobuyoshi, Japanese sumo wrestler
 , Japanese novelist and science fiction writer
 Shizuko Hoshi, Japanese-American actress, theatre director, dancer, and choreographer
 , Japanese voice actor and singer
 , Japanese baseball player
 , Japanese politician and cabinet minister
 , Japanese actress
 , Japanese musician
 , Japanese actress

Arts and entertainment

Anime and manga
  or Stargazing Dog, a Japanese manga series by Takashi Murakami
 , a Japanese manga series by Hidenori Hara
 , a Japanese anime series created by Shotaro Ishinomori
 , a Japanese anime series produced by Jiho Eigasha
  or Voices of a Distant Star, a Japanese OVA directed by Makoto Shinkai
 , a Japanese anime short film directed by Hayao Miyazaki
  or Twinkle Stars, a Japanese manga series by Natsuki Takaya
 , a Japanese anime series based on the movie 
 , a Japanese anime series based on the Kirby series, named Kirby: Right Back at Ya! in English

Fictional characters
 Doctor Light (Kimiyo Hoshi), a superhero in American comic books published by DC Comics
 Hoshi, a character in the Japanese manga series Arakawa Under the Bridge
 Hoshi Sato, a character in the American television series Star Trek: Enterprise
 Lieutenant Hoshi, a character in the American sci-fi media franchise Battlestar Galactica
 Ryoma Hoshi, a character in the Japanese visual novel game Danganronpa V3: Killing Harmony
 Ryu Hoshi, a character in the 1994 Japanese-American action film Street Fighter

Film and television
  (film), a 2011 Japanese film based on the manga of the same name
 , a 1995 Japanese television drama series
 , a 2011 Japanese film based on the manga of the same name

Games
 , a Japanese video game series published by Nintendo, named only Kirby in English
 , a 1987 Japanese video game for the Famicom home console

Music
 , a 1978 album by Japanese pop duo Pink Lady
 "", a 2011 song by Japanese pop singer Alisa Mizuki

Singers
 Hoshi (French singer), French singer, born 1996
 Hoshi (South Korean singer), South Korean singer, born 1996

Other uses
  (Go), an intersection marked with a small dot in the board game Go
 , a traditional Japanese inn founded in 718 AD
 Hoshi University, a private Japanese university specializing in pharmaceutical sciences

See also
 
 
 Hoshii (disambiguation)
 , historical Japanese traveling performers
 "", a 1997 song by Japanese pop singer Miho Komatsu

Japanese-language surnames